Zsolt Bodoni (born 1975) is a Hungarian painter who lives and works in Oradea, Romania.

Work
The special history of Transylvania, its religious and cultural diversity, the mingling of Hungarian, Transylvanian Saxon, Jewish, and Romanian cultures as well as the Eastern-European lethargy and vulnerability of the place are among his defining experiences and this duality is what he is eager to grasp in his work. His art observes and reflects upon this historical scenario with skepticism or irony. He delves into archives, peeling back layers, challenging the accepted interpretations, thus redefining our understanding of the origin of subjects related to history, religion or art.

His mode of expression is expressive figurative painting. His large-scale canvases are at the intersection of his personal history, weird, desolate locations, inhabited by people whose presence is not always clearly decipherable; we do not see ordinary stories but a twisted, displaced abstraction of their meaning. Beside the occasionally deep realism of the world depicted, puzzling abstract details figure on his canvas. It is not a structured world but a special symbiosis of painting and reality. Plot does not carry a narrative function. Figurative elements are torn out of their original context. The forms depicted amidst peeling layers are puzzling and enigmatic but their forelife reveals itself indirectly, uncertainly, unpredictively. Bodies estranged of their environment and of themselves step out of the determinedness of time and place—the Eastern-European past.

Biography
Bodoni was born in Aleşd, Romania, and studied at the Hungarian Academy of Fine Arts in Budapest, receiving his M.F.A. in 2000. Originally trained as a graphichan, he turned his attention to painting in the mid-nineties. After 20 years spent in Budapest, Hungary, in 2014 he returned in his homeland, Transylvania. 
He is the co-founder of the Art colony of Elesd, a one-month artist residency in his natal town, since 1997.

Exhibitions and projects
Solo Exhibitions
 2019 Duo Exhibition with Márton Nemes, BuBu, 1120 Gallery, Buffalo, NY 
 2019 E.H.M.S., Art+Text Budapest, Budapest, Hungary
 2017 Forest, Art+Text Budapest, Budapest, Hungary
 2015 The Shining Path, Green Art Gallery, Dubai, UAE
 2013 King Give Us Soldiers, Green Art Gallery, Dubai, UAE
 2011 Remastered, Brand New Gallery, Milan, Italy
 2011 Gods and Mortals, Mihai Nicodim Gallery, Los Angeles, CA
 2010 Fehérlófia, Son of the White Mare, Ana Cristea Gallery, New York, NY
 2009 The Foundries of Ideology, Ana Cristea Gallery, New York, NY
 2009 Yesterday's Heroes, Tomorrow's Fools, Mihai Nicodim Gallery, Los Angeles, CA
 2008 Monuments, FA Projects, London, UK

Selected Group Exhibitions
 2019 Contemplating the Spiritual in Contemporary Art, Rosenfeld Porcini Gallery, London
 2017 Disruptive Imagination, Art Mill, Szentendre, Hungary
 2016 Gardens and studios, 20 years of the Art Colony of MUCSARNOK, Budapest, Hungary
 2016 Disruptive Imagination, Gallery of Fine Arts, Ostrava, Czech Republic
 2015 THE NUDE in the XX & XXI CENTURY, S|2 Gallery, London, UK
 2014 Turning Points, Hungarian National Gallery, Buda Palace, Budapest, Hungary
 2014 Defaced, Boulder Museum of Contemporary Art, Boulder, CO
 2014 This Side of Paradise, S|2 Gallery, London, UK
 2013 Nightfall, Galerie Rudolfinum, Prague, Czech Republic
 2012 Nightfall, MODEM Centre for Modern and Contemporary Arts, Debrecen, Hungary
 2012 Referencing History, Green Art Gallery, Dubai, UAE
 2012 Zona, MODEM Centre for Modern and Contemporary Arts, Debrecen, Hungary
 2011 East Ex East, Brand New Gallery, Milan, Italy
 2011 Prague Biennale 5, Prague, Czech Republic
 2011 Leipzig Walkabout, Ana Cristea Gallery invited by Galerie Eigen + Art, Leipzig, Germany
 2010 Uncertain Terrain, Knoxville Museum of Art, Knoxville, TN
 2010 After the Fall, HVCCA, Peekskill, NY Year One, Ana Cristea Gallery, New York, NY
 2010 Bad Industry, Mihai Nicodim Gallery, Los Angeles, CA
 2010 Face Your Demons, Milliken Gallery, Stockholm, Sweden
 2010 In Standard Time, Ana Cristea Gallery, New York, NY
 2009 Show Me a Hero, Calvert 22, London, UK
 2009 Staging the Grey, Prague Biennale, Prague, Czech Republic
 2008 15 Hungarian and Romanian Painters, Plan B, Cluj, Romania
 2008 Portraits of Yesterday, Today and Tomorrow, FA Projects, London, UK
 2007 10 years of the Art Colony of Élesd, Ernst Múzeum, Budapest, Hungary

Selected bibliography and press
 2014 This Side of Paradise, exhibition catalogue, ed. By Jane Neal. S|2 Gallery. London, UK
 2013 Nightfall – New Tendencies in Figurative Painting, exhibition catalogue, ed. By Jane Neal. Galerie Rudolfinum, Prague, Czech Republic
 Kalsi, Jyoti. "An Investigation Of Power Games." Gulf News. January 24,
 "Hungarian painter Zsolt Bodoni in Dubai."Time Out Dubai. January 15,
 2012 Neal, Jane. "What Lies Beneath." Flash Art. July–September
 Remastered exhibition catalogue, interview of Jane Neal. Brand New Gallery, Milan, Italy 2011
 "After the Fall." The New York Times. 2011
 2010 Sicha, Choire. "The 23 Must-Buy Artists of the 2010 Miami Art Fairs." The Awl, web. Dec 6 th .
 Chambers, Christopher. "Like a Rolling Stone: Alexander Esters, Peter Gerakaris, Justen Ladda, and Gallery Artists at Ana Cristea Gallery in New York." Dart International. No 27, Fall
 After the Fall exhibition catalogue. HVCCA, New York.
 2009 "Back to Storage." Harper's Bazaar. November 2009: P.17 Taubman, Lara.
 "Zsolt Bodoni at Mihai Nicodim." Art in America. October 2009: PP.175–176.
 "Top 100 Emerging Artists." Flash Art. October 2009: PP.52–53
 2008 Exley, Roy. "Zsolt Bodoni, FA Projects – London." Flash Art. November–December
 2008 Rudkin, Joe. "Portraits of Yesterday, Today and Tomorrow." Flavorpill London, 2008

Collections
Bodoni's work is held in the following public collection:
 Knoxville Museum of Art

Distinctions
 Top 100 Emerging Artists by Flash Art, 2009

References

 Zsolt Bodoni "Taubman, Lara - Reviews - Art in America". Art in America, October 22, 2009 
 "18 Journeys Forged in Communism" Martha Schwendener-Art Review in The New York Times, 14 January 2011

External links
 Official website
 Art+Text Gallery 
 Zsolt Bodoni - Artists - Green . Art . Gallery
 Zsolt Bodoni Archives
 Brand New Gallery Zsolt Bodoni

1975 births
People from Aleșd
Romanian painters
Romanian artists
20th-century Romanian painters
21st-century Romanian painters
Hungarian painters
Hungarian artists
20th-century Hungarian painters
21st-century Hungarian painters
21st-century male artists
Contemporary painters
Living people
Hungarian male painters
20th-century Hungarian male artists